Dameon Clarke is a Canadian actor who has done work for anime, films, TV shows and video games. His voice acting roles have been with Funimation, where he voiced Cell in the Dragon Ball series, Younger Toguro in Yu Yu Hakusho, Scar in Fullmetal Alchemist, Proxy One in Ergo Proxy, Victor Hilshire in Gunslinger Girl, and George Kaminski in Case Closed. In video games, he voices Handsome Jack in the Borderlands series. On camera, he has appeared in TV shows such as Graceland, 24, Castle, Supernatural and Prison Break.

Clarke, who was born in Mississauga, Ontario, also starred in the indie film How to Be a Serial Killer, for which he won several awards at film festivals.

Filmography

Voice acting

Anime

Anime films

Video games

Live-action

Awards and nominations

References

External links
 
 
 

Living people
Canadian expatriate male actors in the United States
Canadian male film actors
Canadian male television actors
Canadian male video game actors
Canadian male voice actors
Male actors from Dallas
Male actors from Los Angeles
Male actors from Ontario
People from Mississauga
20th-century Canadian male actors
21st-century Canadian male actors
Year of birth missing (living people)
Spike Video Game Award winners